Ivan Lee Tedesco (born August 12, 1981) is an American former professional motocross and supercross racer. He competed in the AMA Motocross Championships from 2000 to 2014. Tedesco was the 2005 AMA 125cc Motocross National Champion and was a member of three winning American teams at the Motocross des Nations (2005, 2006 and 2009). He is nicknamed "Hot Sauce", and he raced using the #9.

Motocross racing history
Tedesco was born in Albuquerque, New Mexico. He was not born into a racing family, but began riding with his brother and friends. He began riding motorcycles at the age of 8 and became a professional motocross racer in 1999. He was nicknamed "Hot Sauce" by his first team manager, Kenny Watson, because of his south west routes and the similarity of his last name to the brand Tabasco. Tedesco progressed from 125cc class up to the 450cc Supercross division. After moving to the 450cc class, he sustained numerous different injuries which hampered his progress and, he retired from professional racing in 2014 at the age of 33.

Teams
2000–2001: Plano Honda
2002–2003: Boost Mobile/Yamaha of Troy
2004-2005: Pro Circuit/Monster Energy Kawasaki
2006–2007: Makita Suzuki
2008–2009: Red Bull Honda
2010: Valli Motorsports Yamaha
2011-2012: Hart & Huntington Kawasaki
2014: Rockstar Energy Racing KTM

Accomplishments

2010 
 9th Supercross Series

2009 
 Member of winning USA team at Motocross of Nations
 3rd AMA Motocross Series
 7th 450cc Supercross Series

2008 
 19th AMA/FIM Supercross Series
 13th AMA Motocross Series

2007 
 5th AMA/FIM Supercross Series
 11th AMA Motocross Series

2006 
 4th Amp'd Mobile AMA 450cc Supercross Championship
 Member of winning USA team at Motocross of Nations

2005 
 AMA 125cc National Motocross Series Champion
 THQ AMA 125cc West Supercross Series Champion
 Member of winning USA team at Motocross of Nations

2004 
 6th AMA 125cc Chevrolet Motocross Championship
 AMA 125cc West Supercross Series Champion

2003 
 8th AMA 125cc Chevrolet Motocross Championship
 10th AMA 125cc East Supercross Series

2002
 3rd 125cc West Supercross Series

2001 
 5th 125cc West Supercross Series

2000 
 18th AMA 125cc National Motocross Series

References

1981 births
Living people
Racing drivers from Albuquerque, New Mexico
American people of Italian descent
American motocross riders
AMA Motocross Championship National Champions